Soji Cole is a Nigerian academic, playwright and author. He is the 2018 recipient of the Nigeria Prize for Literature. His research areas are on drama therapy, trauma studies and cross-cultural performance research.

His book, Embers was listed as one of the best Nigerian books for 2018 by Dailytrust Newspaper.

Early life and education 
Born on 27 December 1976, Olusoji Henry Cole was born into the family of Mr Gbadebo John Cole and Mrs Gbemisola Adunni Cole at Mushin Oloosa, Lagos, Nigeria 

Cole is an alumnus of University of Ibadan. He was also a visiting fellow at University of Roehampton.

Writing career 
Cole disclosed to Dailytrust that writing short stories was how he got his first publication. Speaking on challenges of emerging authors in Nigeria, he singled financial constraints and infrastructural decline as factors diminishing the litOloerary drive in the country. He also recounted how electricity was a huge challenge while writing his novels. In an interview with The Sun, Cole recalled that he began writing while in elementary school just to feel among his age-groups. He also narrated how My Little Stream became his first published novel. He published his first play, Maybe Tomorrow (2014), a story based on the plight of the people in the Niger Delta. The book was long-listed for the 2014 Nigeria Prize for Literature, and won the Association of Nigerian Authors (ANA) award. In October 2018, Cole book Embers emerged best out of 89 entries that qualified for the 2018 Nigeria Prize for Literature. The book was on the impact of religious and ethnic violence on the living conditions of persons in Northern Nigeria.

Bibliography 
 My Little Stream (2010) 
 Ghost (2014) 
 Bambo Bambo (2014) 
 Maybe Tomorrow (2014) 
 War Zone (2017) 
 Embers

Recognition 
Aside the awards won below, Cole has been shortlisted for Wole Soyinka Prize for Literature in Africa and BBC World Playwriting Competition.
 African Theater Association (AfTA) Emerging Scholars Prize (2011) 
 The International Federation for Theater Research New Scholar Prize (2013) 
 Association of Nigerian Authors (ANA) Prize for Writing (2014) 
 Nigeria Prize for Literature (2018)

References 

University of Ibadan alumni
Nigerian writers
Nigeria Prize for Literature winners
Academic staff of the University of Ibadan
Living people
Year of birth missing (living people)